Panskura Bradley Birt High School, established on 4 February 1913, is one of the oldest co-ed higher secondary school located in Dakshin Gopalpur, Panskura, Purba Medinipur, West Bengal, India.

The school follows the course curricula of West Bengal Board of Secondary Education (WBBSE) and West Bengal Council of Higher Secondary Education (WBCHSE) for Standard 10th and 12th Board examinations respectively.

History
Initially, the school was established on 1864 as "Punchcoora School". Later, the name of the School was changed to the name of Panskura Bradley Birt High School in the year 1913. Actually Mr. Francis Bradley Bradley-Birt was that time district collector. Later his wife Lady Norah Beatrice Henriette Bradley-Birt who was an educationalist also donate some fund for the school .

References

External links 
  
 Who Was Who among English and European Authors (1931–49)
 The Indian Civil Service 1601–1930. Lewis Sydney Steward O'Malley. J. Murray 1931. p. 299.

High schools and secondary schools in West Bengal
Schools in Purba Medinipur district
1913 establishments in India